Perle is a white German wine grape planted primarily in Franconia. The grape is a crossing of Gewürztraminer and Müller-Thurgau. As a varietal, Perle produces highly aromatic wines.

References

White wine grape varieties